ASDE may refer to:

Airport Surface Detection Equipment (surface movement radar)
ASDE-X (Airport Surface Detection Equipment, Model X), an airport runway safety tool
ASDE-3—Airport Movement Area Safety System
Federación de Scouts-Exploradores de España
ASD Simplified Technical English
ASDEX Upgrade (Axially Symmetric Divertor Experiment)
Alliance of Socialists and Democrats for Europe

See also
ASD (disambiguation)